The 1973–74 season was Newport County's 12th consecutive season in the Football League Fourth Division since relegation at the end of the  1961–62 season and their 46th overall in the Football League.

Season review

Results summary

Results by round

Fixtures and results

Fourth Division

FA Cup

Football League Cup

League table

References

 Amber in the Blood: A History of Newport County.

External links
 Newport County 1973-1974 : Results
 Newport County football club match record: 1974
 Welsh Cup 1973/74

1973-74
English football clubs 1973–74 season
1973–74 in Welsh football